Khorol is a river in Ukraine, a tributary of the Psel in Dnieper River Basin. The Khorol river sources its water near the village of Chervona Sloboda in Nedryhailiv Raion, Sumy Oblast.

General data
The length of the river is 308 km (within Poltava region - 241 km). The area of the catchment is 3 870 km². The slope length is 0.3 m / km. Trapezoidal asymmetric valley has different flat slopes, which length is 10–12 km. Floodplain width reaches from 0,2-0,5 km to 1,5–2 km, and has marshy, shrubby and meadow vegetation. The river channel is wavy with its width between 10 and 60 metres. Power supply is rainy and snowy (spring runoff is about 85% of annual). The average long-term water consumption of Khorol (Myrhorod) is 3.8 m³ / s. The mineralization of water changes during the year: spring flood - 843 mg / dm³; summer-autumn measurements - 966 mg / dm³; winter gauge - 1053 mg / dm³. The river freezes at the end of November or in early December and crashes in March.

Main tributaries
Right: Sakunykha, Rubanka, Vilshana, Tataryna, Oznytsia, Lykhobabivka, Kharpachka, Khomutets, Gremiacha, Kuturzhykha, Avramivka, Lahodynka, Holubykha, Yenkivka, Kryva Ruda, Saha, Tataryna, Shcherbanka.

Left: Berezivka, Staraya Saha, Rudka, Buda, Kholodna.

Populated points
The towns of Lypova Dolyna and Khorol both lie on the Khorol River.. The resort town of Myrhorod also lies along the river.

Use
The Khorol river water is used for general water supply, irrigation and fishing. Several dams and reservoirs have been constructed on the river.

Khorol in history and culture
A settlement of the Bronze Age was found in the river valley, as well as early Slavic settlements and the burial ground of Chernyakhiv culture. A battle between the Rusyns and Polovtsian troops took place on the banks of the river in 1185. Landscapes of Khorol have been attracting  the attention of many artists. Here's how the river was described by the famous Ukrainian poet of the 20th century, Pavlo Tychyna:

"Smoke, smoke from cars,
 
Like maiden summer.
 
Mirgorod have changed
 
Khorol River is not what it was...

(Дим, димок від машин,

Мов дівочі літа.

Не той тепер Миргород,

Хорол-річка не та...)

Geography
Khorol starts from its channels and goes to the north of the village Chervona Sloboda, flows by Prydniprovska lowland on the territory of Nedryhailiv, Lypova Dolyna, near Sumy oblast, Hadiach, Myrhorod, Khorol, Semenivka and Hlobyne of the Poltava oblast. Khorol flows mainly to the south, between the cities of Myrhorod and Khorol — to the southwest, then to the south-east. It also flows into Psel on the northern outskirts of the village of Popivka, Hlobyne and Poltava.

References

 Географічна енциклопедія України: в 3-х томах / Редколегія: О. М. Маринич (відпов. ред.) та ін. — К.: «Українська радянська енциклопедія» імені М. П. Бажана, 1989.
 За ред. А.В. Кудрицького Полтавщина : Енцикл. довід.. — К.: УЕ, 1992. — С. 1024. 
 Енциклопедія українознавства. У 10-х томах. / Головний редактор Володимир Кубійович. — Париж; Нью-Йорк: Молоде життя, 1954—1989.
 «По річках України», К., 1938.

Rivers of Poltava Oblast
Rivers of Sumy Oblast